Charles Frederick Ernest Minnigerode (born Karl Friedrich Ernst Minnigerode, August 6, 1814 in Arnsberg - October 13, 1894 in Alexandria, Virginia) was a German-born American professor and clergyman who is credited with introducing the Christmas tree to Williamsburg.

He was professor of Latin and Greek at the College of William and Mary from 1842 to 1848. A Lutheran, Minnigerode became an Episcopalian. In 1845, he submitted himself as a candidate for the priesthood. The following year Bishop John Johns ordained him to a Bruton Parish deaconate. He became an Episcopal priest in 1847.

In the summer of 1846 the President of William and Mary, Thomas R. Dew, died. The board of visitors attempted to reorganize the college, causing a great deal of faculty discontent. As a result most of the faculty, including the newly appointed president, resigned. The board  then decided to start from scratch, and in 1848 asked for the rest of the faculty's resignations.

After resigning from William and Mary, Minnigerode accepted the pastorate of Merchant's Hope Church in Prince George County where he remained until 1853, when he went to the Freemason Episcopal Church in Norfolk, the largest congregation in the Diocese of Virginia. In 1856, he was appointed rector of St. Paul's Episcopal Church in Richmond, Virginia where he served until 1889.

During his wartime ministry at St. Paul's (which was called "the Cathedral of the Confederacy") Minnigerode baptized Jefferson Davis and officiated the funeral of J.E.B. Stuart.

References

1814 births
1894 deaths
American Episcopal clergy
American classical scholars
College of William & Mary faculty
People from Arnsberg
German emigrants to the United States
19th-century American clergy
Converts to Anglicanism from Lutheranism